The 1888 United States presidential election in Nevada took place on November 6, 1888, as part of the 1888 United States presidential election. Voters chose three representatives, or electors to the Electoral College, who voted for president and vice president.

Nevada voted for the Republican nominee, Benjamin Harrison, over the Democratic nominee, incumbent President Grover Cleveland. Harrison won the state by a margin of 15.79%.

With 57.73% of the popular vote, Nevada would prove to be Harrison's second strongest victory in terms of percentage in the popular vote after Vermont.

Results

Results by county

See also
United States presidential elections in Nevada

References

Nevada
1888
1888 Nevada elections